Mikhail Mikhailovich Markhel (born 10 March 1966) is a Belarusian professional football coach and former player. He is the manager of the Belarus national under-19 football team.

Career
As player, he made his professional debut in the Soviet Second League in 1987 for FC Dnepr Mogilev. He played 2 games in the UEFA Cup 1993–94 for FC Spartak Vladikavkaz. He later played abroad with FK Budućnost Podgorica in the 1991–92 Yugoslav First League and with Nyíregyháza Spartacus in Hungary, before playing in the Russian Premier League with Spartak Vladikavkaz, Torpedo Moscow and Chernomorets Novorossiysk.

International
He played 3 matches for the Belarusian national team in 1994.

Personal life
His brother Yuri Markhel is also a professional footballer.

Managerial statistics

References

External sources
 Biography at Pressball

1966 births
Footballers from Minsk
Living people
Soviet footballers
Belarusian footballers
Association football forwards
Belarus international footballers
Belarusian expatriate footballers
Expatriate footballers in Yugoslavia
Expatriate footballers in Hungary
Expatriate footballers in Russia
Yugoslav First League players
Russian Premier League players
FC Dinamo Minsk players
FC Dnepr Mogilev players
FK Budućnost Podgorica players
Nyíregyháza Spartacus FC players
FC Spartak Vladikavkaz players
FC Torpedo Moscow players
FC Torpedo-2 players
FC Chernomorets Novorossiysk players
FC Torpedo Minsk players
FC Molodechno players
FC Energetik-BGU Minsk players
Belarusian football managers
FC Zvezda-BGU Minsk managers
FC Dynamo Brest managers
FC Belshina Bobruisk managers
Belarus national football team managers